The Most FM is a radio station broadcasting on 100.4 FM in Taranaki, New Zealand. The station is operated by volunteers and owned by the Taranaki FM Trust.

History
The station began in 1995, originally only broadcasting one month out of the year, but by November 1997, it was broadcasting full-time. It operated for almost a decade on 92.3 MHz, being run by a willing and enthusiastic pool of students and volunteers.

As a result of a bureaucratic glitch, Most FM lost its original license in early 2008.  The resulting public outcry caused by Most FM going off air led to the formation of the Taranaki FM Trust, a consortium of local businessmen and well-wishers who vowed to get the station back on air.

In March 2008, after a two-month break in transmission, Most FM began operating on 107.6 FM, but on a very localised frequency range. However, on Friday 15 August, Most FM 'powered up' on the new frequency of 100.4 FM, moving up from 100 to 300 watts. The Most has a wide range of alternative and specialist shows, reflecting the eclectic tastes of its show hosts and DJs. In April 2010 the station began relaying on 88.3 MHz to the town of Oakura which was previously out of range. Internet streaming also resumed online.

The station broadcasts live weekday mornings from 6:30am to 10am. During the day the output is programmed with a live drive show from Monday-Thursday and specialised shows on Friday afternoon. In the evenings a wide range shows are offered by volunteers and cover diverse genres such as Rock, Drum & Bass, Gospel, interviews with NZ artists and comedy. Saturday mornings are dedicated to a live local sports show followed by a live magazine-lifestyle show from 9am-midday. Sundays are given over entirely to volunteers when a full day of shows kicks off at 8am and runs through until 8pm. Classic rock, Blues, Live recordings and Electronica all feature in the mix.

References

Radio stations in New Zealand
1995 establishments in New Zealand
Radio stations established in 1995